Hadrokkosaurus is an extinct genus of brachyopid temnospondyl amphibian from the Middle Triassic of the southwestern United States. It includes a single species, Hadrokkosaurus bradyi, known from the Moenkopi Formation of Arizona.

References

Brachyopids
Triassic amphibians of North America
Triassic amphibians
Taxa named by Samuel Paul Welles
Fossil taxa described in 1957